Nil by Mouth is a 1997 drama film portraying a family in South East London. It was Gary Oldman's debut as a writer and director, and was produced by Oldman, Douglas Urbanski and Luc Besson. It stars Ray Winstone as Raymond, the abusive husband of Valerie, played by Kathy Burke. The score was composed by Eric Clapton.

Plot
In a working-class part of South London live Raymond; his wife, Valerie; her brother, Billy; Valerie and Billy's mother, Janet; and their grandmother, Kathy. Billy is a drug addict, and Raymond kicks him out when he steals drugs from him. Billy hangs out with his heroin addict friends and they shoot up together. The family is dysfunctional, mostly because of Raymond's fiery temper and violent outbursts. When Valerie gets pregnant again, she continues to smoke and drink.

Valerie goes out on the town, and when Ray sees an attractive male friend of hers, he flies into a jealous rage, ordering her out of the pub and into the car. Back home, he accuses her of sleeping with the male friend, and pummels her severely, causing her to miscarry. He tries to win her back, but she leaves him and prepares to start a new life without him. In an alcohol-fuelled rage, he angrily tears their flat apart. He tells Mark, his friend, that the reason for his horrible behavior is his own abusive father, who was the same way with him and his mother. Later, he tries to reconcile with Valerie; however, she is outraged, and says that when she reaches 70, she wants to look back on this part of her life, as she is now 30, as a time when she had some fun. What she has instead is people feeling sorry for her.

Valerie does not want to return to Ray, pointing out they have not got a home to go back to because he has smashed it all up. She will try to find someone to be with that will love her and treat her kindly. Ray goes to see Valerie and asks her if she still loves him. Ray and Valerie are eventually back together again, and Ray has fixed up the apartment. Ray speaks as crudely as ever but begins to restrain himself from his usual angry outbursts. Billy, and his friend Danny, rob a man to support their drug habit and wind up going to prison. This not only reunites Ray with Valerie but reunites the whole family. They go off to visit Billy.

Cast
 Ray Winstone as Raymond ("Ray")
 Kathy Burke as Valerie ("Val")
 Charlie Creed-Miles as Billy
 Laila Morse as Janet
 Edna Doré as Kath
 Chrissie Cotterill as Paula
 Jon Morrison as Angus
 Jamie Foreman as Mark
 Steve Sweeney as Danny

Production
The film depicts the environment Oldman witnessed growing up on a council estate in South East London. Oldman's sister Laila Morse plays Janet and his mother voices a song in the film. The title is a medical instruction (literally "nothing by mouth"), meaning that a patient must not take food or water. The score was composed by Eric Clapton.

Nil by Mouth features the word "cunt" 82 times, more than any other film in history. It also features 428 uses of the word "fuck" and its derivatives, more than any film at the time until Summer of Sam surpassed it two years later; but it remains the highest ranked (as of 2019) with regards to the average number of utterances per minute of running time, with 3.34 / min (leaving aside Swearnet: The Movie, which is more of a concept movie revolving around that very theme, and Fuck, a documentary on the phenomenon).

Reception
Nil by Mouth received generally positive reviews. 

Roger Ebert awarded the film 3.5 out of 4, writing: "The film's portrait of street life in South London is unflinching and observant." Reviewing Nil by Mouth for its 25th anniversary, the Guardian critic Peter Bradshaw gave it five out of five, praising its performances and "pure invention, energy and seriousness".

The film grossed $266,130 from 18 theatres in North America.

Awards and nominations
In 2017, a poll of 150 actors, directors, writers, producers and critics for Time Out ranked Nil by Mouth the 21st-best British film.

 1997 Cannes Film Festival:
 Winner: Best Actress (Kathy Burke)
 Nominee: Palme d'Or (Golden Palm)
 1997 Edinburgh International Film Festival:
 Winner: Channel 4 Director's Award (Gary Oldman)
 1997 European Film Awards:
 Nominee: Best Cinematographer (Ray Fortunato)
 1997 BAFTA Awards:
 Winner: Alexander Korda Award for Best British Film (Luc Besson, Gary Oldman, Douglas Urbanski)
 Winner: BAFTA Award for Best Original Screenplay (Gary Oldman)
 Nominee: Best Performance by an Actor in a Leading Role (Ray Winstone)
 Nominee: Best Performance by an Actress in a Leading Role (Kathy Burke)
 1998 British Independent Film Awards:
 Winner: Best Performance by a British Actor in an Independent Film (Ray Winstone)
 Winner: Best Performance by a British Actress in an Independent Film (Kathy Burke)
 Winner: Most Promising Newcomer in any Category (Laila Morse)
 Nominee: Best British Director of an Independent Film (Gary Oldman)
 Nominee: Best British Independent Film
 Nominee: Best Original Screenplay by a British Writer of a Produced Independent Film (Gary Oldman)
 1998 Empire Awards:
 Winner: Best Debut (Gary Oldman)
 1997 Royal Variety Club of Great Britain
 Winner: Best Film Actress (Kathy Burke)
 1997: Golden Frog Award: 
 Nominee: Cinematography (Ron Fortunato)

See also
 BFI Top 100 British films

References

External links
 
 Screenonline: Nil by Mouth
 Review by Eye for Film, of Nil by Mouth

1997 films
1997 drama films
British drama films
English-language French films
EuropaCorp films
French drama films
Films about domestic violence
Films about dysfunctional families
Films directed by Gary Oldman
Films produced by Luc Besson
Films set in London
Films shot in London
British independent films
French independent films
BAFTA winners (films)
Best British Film BAFTA Award winners
Films whose writer won the Best Original Screenplay BAFTA Award
1997 directorial debut films
1990s English-language films
1990s British films
1990s French films